Teresa Mas (born 13 September 1982) is a Spanish rower. She competed in the women's lightweight double sculls event at the 2004 Summer Olympics.

References

External links
 

1982 births
Living people
Spanish female rowers
Olympic rowers of Spain
Rowers at the 2004 Summer Olympics
Rowers from Barcelona
Mediterranean Games bronze medalists for Spain
Mediterranean Games medalists in rowing
Competitors at the 2005 Mediterranean Games